Fritz Fürst (3 July 1891 – 8 June 1954) was a German footballer who played for Bayern Munich between 1909 and 1914.  His only game in international competition was on 13 May 1913, Germany against Switzerland.  Germany lost 1 to 2, and Fürst was never called back to the national team.  Fürst was one of only three Bayern Munich players to play internationally before World War I.  (The other two were Max Gablonsky and Ludwig Hofmeister.)

References

1891 births
1954 deaths
Footballers from Munich
German footballers
Germany international footballers
FC Bayern Munich footballers
Association football forwards